Borislav Sretkov (born 10 November 1952) is a retired Bulgarian football midfielder.

References

1952 births
Living people
Bulgarian footballers
PFC CSKA Sofia players
Bulgaria international footballers
Association football midfielders